The  Philadelphia Soul season was the eleventh season for the franchise in the Arena Football League. The 2016 season was Clint Dolezel's fourth season with the franchise.  The Soul played most of their home games at the Wells Fargo Center, but then moved their last regular season game and all playoff contests to the PPL Center in the Lehigh Valley city of Allentown.

Standings

Schedule

Regular season
The 2016 regular season schedule was released on December 10, 2015.

Playoffs

Roster

References

Philadelphia Soul
Philadelphia Soul seasons
Philadelphia Soul
ArenaBowl champion seasons